Maheshbati is a village in Raina I CD block in Bardhaman Sadar South subdivision of Purba Bardhaman district in the Indian state of West Bengal.

Geography

Urbanisation
95.54% of the population of Bardhaman Sadar South subdivision live in the rural areas. Only 4.46% of the population live in the urban areas, and that is the lowest proportion of urban population amongst the four subdivisions in Purba Bardhaman district. The map alongside presents some of the notable locations in the subdivision. All places marked in the map are linked in the larger full screen map.

Location

Demographics
As per the 2011 Census of India, Maheshbati had a total population of 1,028 of which 533 (52%) were males and 495 (48%) were females. Population below 6 years was 116. The total number of literates in  Maheshbati was 644 (70.61% of the population over 6 years).

Transport
Maheshbati is on Raina-Karalaghat Road, adjacent to Raina.

Healthcare
Maheshbati Rural Hospital at Maheshbati (with 30 beds) is the main medical facility in Raina I CD block. There are primary health centres at Meral (with 4 beds), Narugram (with 6 beds) and Shyamsundar (with 10 beds).

See also - Healthcare in West Bengal

References

Villages in Purba Bardhaman district